Chris Cooper is an association football commentator in the United Kingdom.

Career

Previously he worked for talkSPORT, commentating on Chelsea and Arsenal matches in the Premier League, plus Liverpool and Manchester United in the UEFA Champions League. He has twice been Head of Sport at Century Radio in Manchester, commentating on Manchester United. He has also commentated on Bradford City and Huddersfield Town for The Pulse.

Up until 2010 he was lead commentator on Sunderland A.F.C. in the Barclays Premier League for Century Radio and subsequently spent two years commentating on them for the club's website. He also spent four years working as a Producer at Sky Sports News Radio. He has done some television commentaries, notably for Yorkshire Television in the 1990s. His favourite team is Plymouth Argyle.

He is currently a freelance reporter working for local and national radio stations.

References 

Sports commentators
Living people
Year of birth missing (living people)